was an airplane that crashed in Malaysia on 27 September 1977. It was a McDonnell Douglas DC-8, registration JA8051, on a flight from Haneda Airport in Tokyo, Japan, to Singapore International Airport in Singapore, with stopovers at Kai Tak Airport in Kowloon Bay, Hong Kong, and Sultan Abdul Aziz Shah Airport in Subang, Malaysia. Ten crew and 69 passengers were on board. It was the second-deadliest aviation disaster to occur in Malaysia at the time.

Aircraft 
The aircraft involved was a Douglas DC-8-62H (serial number 46152 and factory 550), manufactured in 1971, and delivered to Japan Air Lines on 23 August. It was registered as JA8051. The aircraft was powered by four Pratt & Whitney JT3D-3B turbofan engines.

Accident 
Two hours into the flight, air traffic control at Sultan Abdul Aziz Shah Airport told flight 715 to start its approach and land on runway 15. The flight crew started their approach, putting the landing gear down and extending the flaps. The aircraft broke on impact, and a fire erupted, which was extinguished by airport rescue and firefighting.

The accident killed 34 people: eight of the 10 crew and 26 of the 69 passengers. Forty-five survivors, among the passengers and crew, were taken to a hospital. The remains from the crash could be found in the soil surrounding the estate until 2011. Most of the land now is being converted to developments.

A memorial was built in the Japanese cemetery in Malaysia.

The crash was the second-deadliest aviation disaster to occur in Malaysia until the crash of Malaysian Airline System Flight 653, two months later, with 100 fatalities.

Investigation 
The Malaysian Department of Civil Aviation  investigated the accident. At the time of the crash, the weather around the airport was poor and the aircraft was on a VOR approach. The investigation determined that the cause of the accident was the captain descending below the minimum descent altitude without having the runway in sight, and continuing the descent, causing the aircraft to crash before reaching the airport. The flight crew loss of sight of the airport due to bad weather, which also contributed to the accident. In addition, the first officer did not challenge the captain for violating the regulations.

References

External links 

 Entry at Aviation-Safety.net
 
 Memorial of the crash site 

September 1977 events in Asia
Transport in Kuala Lumpur
History of Kuala Lumpur
1977 in Malaysia
Aviation accidents and incidents in 1977
Aviation accidents and incidents in Malaysia
715
Airliner accidents and incidents involving controlled flight into terrain
Airliner accidents and incidents caused by weather
Airliner accidents and incidents caused by pilot error
Accidents and incidents involving the Douglas DC-8
1977 in Japan